Kempster is an unincorporated community located in Langlade County, Wisconsin, United States.

History
A post office called Kempster was established in 1882, and remained in operation until it was discontinued in 2002. The community was named for Dr. Kempster, a member of staff at a psychiatric hospital.

References

Unincorporated communities in Langlade County, Wisconsin
Unincorporated communities in Wisconsin